Salim Moin (26 September 1961 – 6 November 2020) was a former Singaporean footballer who played for the Singapore national football team and managed S.League side Hougang United.

He played for the Lions in the Malaysia Cup during the 1980s alongside stars such as David Lee, Terry Pathmanathan, S. Anthonysamy, Malek Awab and Borhan Abu Samah. During his playing career, Salim served a six-year ban from 1984 for assaulting referee M. Kunalan in a President's Cup match between Jubilee and Farrer Park United in September 1983; The ban was lifted at the end of 1986 following a successful third appeal.

Coaching career

After retiring, Salim started his coaching career with NFL side Tampines SC at the end of the 1996.

Salim spent two seasons with Gombak United as their Prime League and senior team coach before he joined National Football Academy for two years from 2009 to 2010. Upon expiry of his NFA contract, he joined Balestier Khalsa Football Club, first as an assistant coach to Nasaruddin Jalil for the 2010 season, and as head coach for their 2011 season. In 2012, he replaced R. Balasubramaniam as the head coach of Woodlands Wellington FC, who were seeking to rejuvenate their squad after two disappointing seasons as back to back wooden spoonists.

Several players from Balestier also followed Salim after his switch to Woodlands, including young midfielders Armanizam Dolah, Shamsurin Abdul Rahman and K. Sathiaraj, as well as custodian Ahmadulhaq Che Omar, who was back with a second stint at the northern club.

Although the Rams finished last with their third successive wooden spoon in as many seasons during their first season under Salim, he was working with players who were chosen under former Woodlands coach, R. Balasubramaniam. After a major clearout of the team following the end of the 2012 season, he was given a chance to transfer in some of his preferred players for the 2013 season. He has also targeted a top six finish for the club during a pre-season interview in December 2012, which is a higher target than the top eight finish set by the club a month earlier.

Appointed as Tampines Rovers head coach at the start of the 2014 season, Salim only lasts until 27 April 2014, when he resigned as Tampines coach following the club's exit from the 2014 AFC Cup.

Salim made his return to Woodlands Wellington as head coach in June 2014, replacing sacked Darren Stewart. After the merger of Woodlands Wellington with Hougang United in 2015, Salim was announced as the new head coach of Hougang United. Towards the end of that season, Salim was replaced by K. Balagumaran, as Hougang would eventually finished last in the table.

Death 
Salim died on 6 November 2020 at age 59 due to a heart attack.

Coaching career statistics

League career statistics

Key: P–games played, W–games won, D–games drawn; L–games lost, %–win percentage

Cup competition statistics
2012 Singapore Cup – First Round
2012 Singapore League Cup – Plate Competition Semi-Finalists

Honours
Singapore FA
Malaysia Cup: 1980
Sultan Haji Ahmad Shah Cup: 1989

References

1961 births
2020 deaths
Singaporean footballers
Singapore international footballers
Association football midfielders
Singaporean football managers
Singapore FA players
Tampines Rovers FC head coaches
Woodlands Wellington FC head coaches
Singapore Premier League head coaches
Balestier Khalsa FC head coaches
Southeast Asian Games silver medalists for Singapore
Southeast Asian Games medalists in football
Competitors at the 1981 Southeast Asian Games